Calvary University is a private Christian university in Kansas City, Missouri. In 2019, total enrollment was 430, with undergraduate enrollment of 348 and graduate enrollment of 82.

History

The university originally opened in 1932 as Calvary Bible College.

Calvary University is a result of a merger in 1961 between two small Bible colleges—Kansas City Bible College (est. 1932) and Midwest Bible College (est. 1938) in St. Louis. The two schools moved to a campus in the Kansas City suburban community of Prairie Village, Kansas, and became Calvary Bible College. In 1987, Citadel Bible College of Ozark, Arkansas merged in. In 1966, Calvary moved to 1111 West 39th Street in Kansas City, where it remained until 1980.  In 1980 it moved to its current campus at the former Richards-Gebaur Air Force Base.

In mid-2016, Calvary re-branded as Calvary University. Reasons for the name change included the difficulty graduates were having with finding employment with a degree from a Bible college, the increased difficulty in accessing some countries for missions with a degree from a Bible college, the perception that a Bible college only prepares people for full-time church ministry, and the perception that a Bible college offers a lesser quality of education. Further, Calvary's mission, degree offerings, accreditation, and undergraduate and graduate divisions are all broader than the traditional Bible college classification.

Academics
Calvary is accredited by the Higher Learning Commission (since 2003) and the Association for Biblical Higher Education (since 1947). It offers over 60 degrees through both traditional and online education, including associate degrees and an adult degree completion program.

Campus
The Calvary campus is located in Kansas City, Missouri. Calvary's residence hall offers accommodations to on-campus students, and Philadelphia Hall offers housing to married students. Administration and Admissions offices are located in Madison Hall. Liberty Chapel hosts an auditorium, several classrooms, the Student Lounge, and the Warrior Cafe and mail room. Other classes are held in the East Education Building and the Center for Advanced Biblical Research and Engagement (CABRE). Athletic events take place in the Pyramid Gym. The cafeteria, assemblies, and other student events are held in the Student Life Center, located next to the Hilda Kronecker Library.

Athletics
The Calvary Warriors offer sports for Men's and Women's Basketball, Men's Soccer, Women's Volleyball, and Men's and Women's Cross Country. In each of these sports the Warriors compete against other colleges in regular season games and post-season tournaments. The Warriors are members of the Midwest Christian College Conference (MCCC) and the Association of Christian College Athletics (ACCA).

2012 National Soccer Championship
The Warriors' Men's Soccer team took the ACCA national title in November 2012.

2021 Regional Basketball Championship
The Warriors' Men's Basketball team won their first NCCAA North Region Championship to advance to the NCCAA DII National Championship tournament.

References

External links
 

Association of Christian College Athletics member schools
Seminaries and theological colleges in Missouri
Universities and colleges in Kansas City, Missouri
Bible colleges
Educational institutions established in 1932
1932 establishments in Missouri